Stonesiella selaginoides (common name - Clubmoss bush-pea) is a species of flowering plant in the legume family, Fabaceae. It belongs to the subfamily Faboideae. It is the only member of the genus Stonesiella and is endemic to Tasmania. It is named to recognise Australian botanical illustrator, Margaret Stones.

References

Mirbelioids
Monotypic Fabaceae genera
Taxa named by Michael Crisp